Vincent Massey High School is a high school in Brandon, Manitoba, Canada, and part of the Brandon School Division.  The school opened in 1960 and it currently has more than 1100 students. The school is named for former Governor General of Canada Vincent Massey.

Notable alumni
Chris Bauman, football player
Israel Idonije, professional football player
James McCrae (politician), politician
Zach Whitecloud, professional ice hockey player.

References

External links
Official website

1960 establishments in Manitoba
Buildings and structures in Brandon, Manitoba
Education in Brandon, Manitoba
Educational institutions established in 1960
High schools in Manitoba